The Departmental Council of Haute-Vienne is the deliberative assembly of the French department of Haute-Vienne. Its headquarters are in Limoges, in the former  in rue François Chénieux.

Executive

President 
The president of the Haute-Vienne departmental council has been Jean-Claude Leblois (PS) since April 2, 2015. He was re-elected on July 1, 2021.

Vice-Presidents 
The President of the Departmental Council is assisted by 12 vice-presidents chosen from among the departmental councillors. Each of them has a delegation of authority.

Composition 
The departmental council of Haute-Vienne comprises 42 departmental councilors elected from the 21 cantons of Haute-Vienne.

Budget 
The departmental council of Haute-Vienne in 2021 had a budget of 458.3 million euros.

References 

Haute-Vienne
Haute-Vienne